Charles-François Daubigny (15 February 181719 February 1878) was a French painter, one of the members of the Barbizon school, and is considered an important precursor of impressionism.

He was also a prolific printmaker, mostly in etching but also as one of the main artists to use the cliché verre technique.

Biography
Daubigny was born in Paris, into a family of painters; taught the art by his father, and his uncle, miniaturist Pierre Daubigny (1793-1858). He was also a pupil of Jean-Victor Bertin, Jacques Raymond Brascassat and Paul Delaroche, from whom he would quickly emancipate himself.

In 1838, he set up, at the Rue des Amandiers-Popincourt, a community of artists, a phalanstery, with Adolphe-Victor Geoffroy-Dechaume, Hippolyte Lavoignat, Ernest Meissonnier, Auguste Steinheil, Louis Joseph Trimolet, with whom he already had expressed his interest in subjects drawn directly from daily life and nature. These artists will work, among others, for the publisher Léon Curmer, who was specialized in books illustrated with vignettes. From this period date the first confirmed engravings by Daubigny.

Initially Daubigny painted in a more traditional style, but this changed after 1843 when he settled in Barbizon to work outside in the nature. Even more important was his meeting with Camille Corot in 1852 in Optevoz (Isère). On his famous boat Botin, which he had turned into a studio, he painted along the Seine and Oise, often in the region around Auvers. From 1852 onward he came under the influence of Gustave Courbet. The two artists were from the same generation and were driven by the realist movement: during a joint stay, each composed a series of views of Optevoz.

In 1848, Daubigny worked on behalf of the Chalcographie du Louvre, performing facsimiles, which testifies to his great expertise in this art, and revisiting the technique of aquatint in a less cumbersome process. His famous series of Rolling Carts dates from this period. In 1862, with Corot, he experimented with the cliché-verre technique, halfway between photography and printmaking.

In 1866, he joined the jury of the Paris Salon for the first time, alongside his friend Corot. The same year, Daubigny visited England, eventually returning because of the Franco-Prussian war, in 1870. In London he met Claude Monet, and together they left for the Netherlands. Back in Auvers, he met Paul Cézanne, another important Impressionist. It is assumed that these younger impressionist painters were influenced by Daubigny.

Daubigny died in Paris in 1878. His remains are interred at cimetière du Père-Lachaise (division 24). His followers and pupils included his son  (whose works are occasionally mistaken for those of his father), Hippolyte Camille Delpy, Albert Charpin and Pierre Emmanuel Damoye. The two painters who introduced the Barbizon School in Portugal, in 1879, António da Silva Porto and João Marques de Oliveira, where also his disciples.

Paintings

The most striking paintings by Daubigny were those produced between 1864 and 1874, which depict mostly forest landscapes and lakes. Disappointed because he felt that he did not meet with the same level of success and admiration as his contemporaries, by the end of his career he was nonetheless an extremely sought-after and appreciated artist. The motifs of his paintings, sometimes tending towards repetitiveness and often playing on the horizontality of the landscape underlined by a backlight effect, would be taken up and accentuated by Hippolyte Camille Delpy, his most influenced student.

His most ambitious canvases include Springtime (1857), in the Louvre; Borde de la Cure, Morvan (1864); Villerville sur Mer (1864); Moonlight (1865); Auvers-sur-Oise (1868); and Return of the Flock (1878).  He was named by the French government as an Officer of the Legion of Honor.

In popular culture
The life of Daubigny was adapted into a graphic novel by Belgian comics writer Bruno de Roover and artist Luc Cromheecke. It appeared under the title De Tuin van Daubigny (The Garden of Daubigny, 2016).

Public collections
Among the public collections holding works by Charles-François Daubigny are:

Gallery

See also
Daubigny's Garden, painted three times by Vincent van Gogh.

Notes

References

Further reading
 (see index)

External links

 Charles-François Daubigny – Museum – Musée Daubigny Auvers-sur-Oise 
 Charles-François Daubigny's Home-Studio – Maison-Atelier de DAUBIGNY Auvers-sur-Oise. Historical monument.
 Charles-François Daubigny – Rehs Galleries' biography on the artist.
 Charles-François Daubigny at Artcyclopedia

1817 births
1878 deaths
Painters from Paris
19th-century French painters
French male painters
French Realist painters
Officiers of the Légion d'honneur
Burials at Père Lachaise Cemetery
19th-century French male artists